Abraham Anshelovich Manievich or Abram Manevich (25 November 1881 Mstsislaw, Belarus – 30 June 1942 Bronx, United States) was a Ukrainian-American expressionist artist of Belarusian-Jewish origin.

Life
He studied art at the Kiev Art School from 1901 to 1905, and at the Academy of Art in Munich, Germany. After travelling and successfully exhibiting in Italy, France, and Switzerland as well as Kiev, he lived in Moscow from 1916 to 1917.

A co-founder of the Ukrainian Academy of Arts, he taught at the Ukrainian Academy of Fine Arts. 
In 1921, Following the death of his son in the pogrom-initiated destruction of the Kiev ghetto, he immigrated to the United States. His continued work enjoyed critical acclaim until his death.

His work is in the National Art Museum of Ukraine and in major museums and private collections in the United States, Canada, France, Israel, Russia, and Ukraine.
His papers are held at the Archives of American Art.

Gallery

Further reading
Abraham Manievich by Alan Pensler and Mimi Ginsberg, New York: Hudson Hills ; Woodbridge : ACC Distribution [distributor], 2012.*

References

External links
Abraham Manievich - Biography
Abraham Manievich (1881/83-1942)
Abraham Manievich past auction

1881 births
1942 deaths
People from Mstsislaw
People from Mstislavsky Uyezd
Belarusian Jews
Soviet emigrants to the United States
American people of Belarusian-Jewish descent
Jewish American artists
Academic staff of the National Academy of Visual Arts and Architecture
Ukrainian avant-garde